The Union Avenue is an American ungraded Thoroughbred horse race run annually at Saratoga Race Course. The race is restricted to fillies and mares 3-years-old and up who were bred in the State of New York.  It is raced at a current (2014) distance of six and one half furlongs on the dirt and offers a purse of $100,000 added.

The Union Avenue, inaugurated in 2004, is named for the famed street in Saratoga Springs, New York where the track is located.

Records 
Most wins by a jockey:

 3 – Edgar Prado (2004, 2006, 2008)

Most wins by an trainer:

 3 – Linda Rice (2014, 2016, 2020)

Most wins by an owner:

 No owner has won this race more than once

Winners of the Union Avenue Stakes

References
 Saratoga Race Course at the NYRA
 Union Avenue Stakes at Pedigree query

Sprint category horse races for fillies and mares
Horse races in New York (state)
Ungraded stakes races in the United States
Saratoga Race Course
2004 establishments in New York (state)
Recurring sporting events established in 2004